The Crisfield Armory is a historic National Guard armory located at Crisfield, Somerset County, Maryland, United States. It is two stories tall with a full basement, emulates a Medieval fortification, and was built in 1927. Attached to the rear of this two-story main block is a narrower one-story drill hall. The front features a central section flanked by two, three-story tall towers. The State Seal of Maryland appears in a large square stone panel at the roofline, surmounted by three crenelles with stone caps. It is located within the boundaries of the Crisfield Historic District.

The Crisfield Armory was listed on the National Register of Historic Places in 1985.

References

External links
, including photo from 1980, at Maryland Historical Trust

Crisfield, Maryland
Armories on the National Register of Historic Places in Maryland
Infrastructure completed in 1927
Buildings and structures in Somerset County, Maryland
Individually listed contributing properties to historic districts on the National Register in Maryland
National Register of Historic Places in Somerset County, Maryland
Historic district contributing properties in Maryland